The anti-Chechen pogrom in Eastern Kazakhstan took place in spring and summer, 1951, in Eastern Kazakhstan (part of the Soviet Union at the time), upon ethnic tensions between mainly ethnic Russians and deported Chechens. A blood libel rumor, according to which the Chechens allegedly use "Christian blood in their rituals" may also have contributed to the escalation of events. The riots occurred in 3 cities - Leninogorsk, Ust-Kamenogorsk and Zyryanovsk.

The main riots took place on April 10, 1951, in the Chechen-city neighbourhood of Leninogorsk. The riots, led by groups of amnestied criminals upon the Chechen civilians led to the deaths of 40-41 people, mainly of North Caucasian origins. Arrests were late made by Soviet authorities on initiators and 50 people from among the criminals were persecuted by courts, though no riot leaders were identified.

See also
Aardakh
Ethnic violence
Racism in Russia
1958 Grozny riots
Blood libel

References

Anti-Chechen pogrom in
Anti-Chechen sentiment
Anti-Caucasus sentiment
History of Chechnya
Anti-Chechen pogrom 1951
Violence against Muslims
Pogroms
blood libel
Riots and civil disorder in the Soviet Union
Eastern Kazakhstan, anti-Chechen pogrom in
Eastern Kazakhstan, anti-Chechen pogrom in
Eastern Kazakhstan, anti-Chechen pogrom in
1951 riots
Ethnic conflicts in Kazakhstan
Massacres in the Soviet Union
1951 murders in the Soviet Union